Frederick Cooper Llosa (born 1939) is a Peruvian architect and professor. 

In 2005 he founded the School of Architecture at the Pontificia Universidad Católica del Perú, where he was also a professor.

His drawings and models are included in the collection of the Museum of Modern Art, New York. Llosa was the first South American architect to join the Royal Institute of British Architects as an honorary member.

Selected projects
Museum of Contemporary Art, Lima (2013)

References

20th-century Peruvian architects
Peruvian architects
1936 births
Living people
People from Lima